Reay Road (station code: RRD) is a railway station on the Harbour Line of the Mumbai Suburban Railway. 
The station was named after Lord Reay, Governor of Bombay between 1885 and 1890. It was opened in 1910 and was originally used as a terminus for the Kurla - Reay Road harbour line on the Great Indian Peninsular Railway, the first railway line in India.

The station's single storey colonial building has an exposed stone masonry facade, hooded segmental arches along the front, rectangular pilasters and a lean-to roof.

The station is a Grade-I heritage structure. The other 4 railway stations on Mumbai's heritage list include Chhatrapati Shivaji Maharaj Terminus, Western Railways Headquarters Building (Churchgate), Bandra railway station and Byculla railway station.  
 

The letters GIPR can be seen on either side of the station. GIPR is the abbreviation for Great Indian Peninsula Railway, the first rail line in India.

The tracks have been extended for 12 car local trains. The track passes under a road connecting both sides of the station platform.

Britannia, a famous brand of baked goods has a bakery in this area. A forging mill is present next to the railway station. The station gives access for many Iron goods stockists in the area. These Stockists stock iron beams, rods, plates etc. in the nearby warehouses and trade from there. This place is also a source for traders who depend on the ship breaking industry.

References

Mumbai Suburban Railway stations
Railway stations in Mumbai City district
Mumbai CR railway division
Railway stations opened in 1910